Austrians in the United Kingdom include citizens or non-citizen immigrants of the United Kingdom who originate from Austria.

History
Austrians have been present in what is now the UK for centuries as merchants, traders and diplomats, but it was only during the 1930s when Austrians came to the UK in significant numbers. The vast majority of these were Austrian Jews who fled to the UK to escape Nazi persecution during the Third Reich or 'National Socialist Period' (1933–1945).

Population
According to the 2001 UK Census, 19,511 Austrian-born people were living in Great Britain, which was a drop of around 5% from 1991. The population spread of Austrian-born people can be seen below.

Notable Austrians in the United Kingdom
 Gabrielle Anwar, British-born actress of Austrian and Indian descent
 Anna Freud, Austrian-born psychologist
 Sigmund Freud, Austrian-born psychologist
 Sir Ernst Gombrich, Austrian-born art historian
 Friedrich Hayek, Austrian-born economist
 William Patrick Hitler, nephew of Adolf Hitler 
 Andy Hunt, British-born footballer of Austrian and English descent
 Myleene Klass, British-born singer, actress, TV presenter and model of Austrian and Filipino descent
 Siegfried Frederick Nadel, anthropologist, specialising in African ethnology
 Sir Karl Popper, Austrian-born philosopher of science
 Joe Skarz, British-born footballer of Austrian and English descent
 Friedrich von Hügel, Roman Catholic layman, religious writer, Modernist theologian and Christian apologist
 Ruby Wax, American-born comedian of Austrian descent
 Ludwig Wittgenstein, Austrian-born philosopher and engineer who also obtained British citizenship
 Rachel Weisz, British-born actress of Austrian and Hungarian descent.
 Rachel Khoo, British-born cook and author of Austrian and Malaysian descent.

See also  
 Austria–United Kingdom relations
 Austrian Americans

References

External links
Austrian Club London

 
 
Austrian diaspora in Europe
Immigration to the United Kingdom by country of origin
Austria–United Kingdom relations